Mangalya Dosham/Mangalya Sandhosham is an Indian Tamil-language horror drama airing on Colors Tamil. It premiered on 23 March 2020 under the title Mangalya Dosham but due to COVID-19 lockdown it had been re-premiered on 28 May 2020. It is dubbed in Odia and airs on Colors Odia from 14 September and abruptly stopped. The show stars Lakshmipriya, Arun Padmanabhan, Ravi Tej Keerthy and Jeeva in lead roles. The show had crossover episodes with Amman from 10 May 2021 to 14 September 2021 which moved without the main leads Tharun and Nithya. The show ended on 11 September 2021.

Plot

1920
This incident happened in 1920; there lived a Zamindar family in Manikkapuram. A low-caste commoner named Raghuvaran (Ravi Tej) truly loved the Zamindar's daughter Nayanthara (Lakshmipriya). But when Raghuvaran proposed this idea to the courtiers he was insulted badly and was challenged by the Zamindar through a deal that is to become rich within 1 year to marry Nayanthara. Within a few months Raghuvaran succeeds in becoming an extremely rich individual.

On one fateful day when Raghuvaran arrived at the palace with a pure intention that's to arrange a marriage proposal of him with his beloved Nayanthara (as per the challenge and the deal made by the Zamindar to him) with many jewelleries, 9 types of precious stones (Navaratna) and a heap of 24 carat gold coins, he was confronted by a shocking event which shattered his heart into many pieces that is the Marriage of his beloved Nayanthara with another man (a lousy choice by the Zamindar) who already tied the knot on Nayanthara's neck.

Raghuvaran was truly hurt by such an event as he realised that the Zamindar cheated on him. On the same night Raghuvaran appeared before Nayanthara and her husband and killed the groom (the funny thing is the lousy groom was still smiling while he got his throat slit by our hero).

The next day Raghuvaran took a vow before sunset, saying that in every birth Nayanthara takes, he will never allow another man to marry her and even if that happens the Fate (Death) that befell the groom (Nayanthara's husband) will eventually happen to the other men's who try to gain her hand for marriage until she soulfully accepts his pure and true love he has on her.

After this, Raghuvaran was hanged by Nayanthara on a Peepal Tree where his unrest soul haunted for 100 years waiting for the next reincarnation of Nayanthara.

2020
Nayanthara is reincarnated as Nithyashree/Nithya (Lakshmipriya) who is born with an evil omen in her horoscopic astrological chart that is Mangalyam Dosham also known as "The Curse of Mars" which represents a powerful curse that she carries from her previous birth. She is a Bharathanatyam dancer. Tarun (Arun Padmanabhan) is an handsome doctor who falls in love with Nithya at first sight. On the other hand, Raghuvaran (Ravi Tej) comes as a ghost with a pure intention of reuniting with his beloved Nayanthara aka Nithya in many ways. A stage comes when Tarun and Nithya's marriage is fixed, but Deepika (Keerthi Vijay) doesn't want Nithya to marry Tarun as she likes Tarun, so she tries to separate them. Against all odds, they get married, but her father in law doesn't like her as he wanted Deepika to become his daughter in law. Tarun and Nithya go for honeymoon where Raghuvaran successfully swaps place with Tarun with Yamini's help who puts an extremely strong dosage of sleeping pill into Tarun's drink  [actually it's Raghuvaran's place but a Mongoose Mandaiyan stole our hero Raghuvaran's rightful place].

During their stay in the honeymoon resort, Raghuvaran disguised as Tarun tells an important story to Nithya who in return was delighted to hear a story. It is a love story that happened 100 years ago in England between Michael's (the Landlord) daughter Emily and a man named James who was working in the Landlord's estate and how he loved her sincerely. One day he decided to arrange a marriage proposal with the landlord's daughter with her father's consent, to which the Landlord Michael agreed to the marriage proposal of James with one condition that James have to become rich within the duration of a year. After a few months later, James comes back as a rich Landlord with full of hopes to reunite with his beloved Emily only to be disheartened when he sees his beloved Emily married another man arranged by her father Michael. This enraged James who proceeds to shoot the groom with a gun and in turn he was shot by his beloved Emily. Raghuvaran aka Tarun ends the story here and asks Nithya: Nithya based on this story I want to ask you some questions, the first question "Who was the one who committed the crime in this story" to which Nithya replied: It is actually a big crime for the Landlord Michael to give false promises as promise is really a very holy act and it is really important to keep up with the promise you make and give to anyone whether you like the person or not. Then Raghuvaran proceeds with the second question by saying: "Okay Nithya I agree with your first answer now I want you to answer my second question that is "Emily shot James dead for killing her newly wed husband without realising his (James) love for her, does her act shows any kind of crime for not realising his love for her" and my third question "Is it a crime for James to love her?" Nithya says that, "Basically Emily is in a state of shock for what had happened because she just lost her husband and that's the reason why she shot him (James) while for James it isn't a crime for him to love Emily because his love for her is really truly sincere and both their act doesn't qualify as crimes at all." This leads to the last question our hero Raghuvaran has in store for Nithya, Raghuvaran says: "This comes to my last question Nithya, if ever both of them are reincarnated again in this world, would you want them to live happily ever together forever?" to which Nithya said that: "Yes I would love if both of them reunite, marry and live happily ever after because that would be the one and only right thing to happen" Nithya continues by saying: "What else does Emily have to do other than marrying the guy (James) who truly and sincerely loves her?" Raghuvaran who currently is disguised as Tarun agrees with Nithya's answer while secretly he was very happy and content with Nithya's reply because this truly confirms that Raghuvaran is on the right track in each and every actions he is doing as the love story of Emily and James is actually his 100 years Love History with Nayanthara. (In other words, he is fighting the right fight to be together with his beloved Nayanthara who is reincarnated as Nithya.)

After the honeymoon trip, Nithya was always worried as she was keen in throwing her marital thread in a fire (the same marital thread that she tied on herself under the haunted peepal tree as a remedial measure to overcome her Mangalya Dosham before her accidental marriage with Tarun). Raghuvaran helps Nithya to throw that marital thread in fire thus ending Nithya's worries. Then Raghuvaran goes disguised as Tarun to Tarun's house while Tarun comes into the custody of Yamini. But Nithya and her grandmother had a doubt if it was really Tarun as they sensed some changes in him. But with his magic, he made everyone believe that it is Tarun. The real Tarun was saved by Thulasi (I hope Raghuvaran kills her in the utmost brutal manner as she really is the most annoying character in the whole series) and her gang of ghost hunters from Yamini Yakshini, a helper to Raghuvaran who is also a nature spirit. Thulasi and her gang save Tarun and promise to help him unite with Nithya as her father died while trying to capture Raghuvaran's ghost. But unfortunately all their plans fail. Tarun's father Arumugam accepts Nithya as Deepika's family bond with Nithya only to fool her. But Arumugam doesn't know this. Tarun's parents prepare for Nithya and fake Tarun's first night, but the real Tarun became furious on Thulasi for not doing anything. Thulasi understanding Tarun's situation finds help from an Aghori during the same time before Nithya's first night. That bloody Aghori interrupted Raghuvaran's first night with Nithya and he further tied Raghuvaran with his magical powers.

During this time, Mongoose Mandaiyan Tarun enters his house and brings Nithya to a temple where Perichaali Moonji Thulasi is waiting. Both He and Thulasi confuses Nithya that the Tarun at home is not the real one but an evil, atrocious, blood thirsty spirit known as Raghuvaran who is trying to convey his unrequited love feelings to Nithya for more than 100 years. Nithya believes the lies of Tarun and Thulasi and agrees blindly to act accordingly to their plan to destroy Raghuvaran while still not understanding his love for her.

After this short meeting Thulasi urges Tarun to send back Nithya to home to avoid Raghuvaran from coming to know anything about this incident as the aghori's magical powers of restraining Raghuvaran might be over any moment. Even though Tarun manages to send Nithya back home before Raghuvaran returns, Raghuvaran manages to discover the truth by his sensing powers and his vision.

The next day Thulasi infiltrates the house claiming that Dhanam (Tarun's housemaid) is her Chitti. Thulasi's main aim and target is to somehow accompany Nithya and find a way how to get rid of Raghuvaran aka Tarun and bring the real Tarun back to his own home.

During her stay at Tarun's home she discovers that Deepika was collecting the hair, nails, handkerchief, shirt, and a handful of soil that has the footprints of Tarun for a yet unrevealed ulterior agenda. Thulasi prepares a duplicate of Deepika's collection and swaps without Deepika's knowledge. She, Kodanggi and Nithya then follows Deepika to a house of a Namboodhiri and waits until Deepika have gone.

Once Deepika leaves the place with disappointment, Thulasi, Kodanggi and Nithya enters the Namboodhiri's house to see him. The Namboodhiri recognises Thulasi as the daughter of Muthu Karuppan who was killed by Raghuvaran for trying to destroy him. He accepts to help Thulasi who hands over a bag containing all the materials collected by Deepika and asked the Namboodhiri to find out the identity and history of this person as this individual is definitely not Tarun as claimed by Deepika earlier.

The Namboodhiri reveals that those materials belonged to Raghuvaran a guy who has harboured a strong and powerful love bond on Nayanthara whose present reincarnation is Nithya. He said that no one other than God alone can destroy Raghuvaran as he is a being made purely from love. He gives a Crystal Lingam to Nithya telling her to worship it every day. He further mentions that the Lingam can only protect a specific place or individual from unrest souls but not totally destroying them.

Nithya brings the Crystal Lingam home and starts worshiping it. Her act of worshiping the Lingam creates a wave of energy that hits Raghuvaran hard depleting his magical powers and energy level. Raghuvaran eventually lost his disguise as Tarun and was forced to evade from being discovered by Nithya but before he evaded he learnt that Thulasi is the daughter of Muthu Karuppan.

At late night hours on the same day, Raghuvaran attempted to enter the house but he is unable to enter due to the Lingam's protection as its energy causes a burning sensation whenever he tries to enter. Raghuvaran disguised as Tarun then decides to use Deepika (since she sincerely loves Tarun) as a way for him to enter back into the house but his plan ends up failing when Nithya acting under the orders of Thulasi and the real Tarun uses the Crystal Lingam against him destroying his body. Before his body was destroyed by the Lingam, Raghuvaran tried to make Nithya understand his love for her but Nithya is really so stupid, moronic, buffoon and at the same time blinded by Tarun and Thulasi's orders as usual ends up destroying Raghuvaran's body without fully understanding and coming to terms with her past life incidents and Raghuvaran's love for her which is infinite. Raghuvaran who lost his body during this fight was forced to flee from the place in search of a new body.

A selfish and lust minded Tarun finally feels very happy as he is able to enter his house. The first thing he does is to think on how he is going to approach Nithya and have his first night with her. But due to Nithya's self control this doesn't happen immediately. So Tarun was forced to shift his attention on building a new hospital in a land that his father bought a long time ago. In that hospital Raghuvaran is living in the form of dog and Nithya goes there to kill herself by piercing her stomach and Raghuvaran comes to his ghost form and cries and goes away. Tarun and his family members became depressed after nithya's death. But the twist is she has been taken to a temple by a strange man and the goddess saves nithya. After that the hospital building track is in complete and the story travels to Raghuvaran's descendants home where nithya works as a maid and she possess divine powers 
of the Goddess and cures people in the hospital where Ranjith(doctor) worked. Raghuvaran's descendants family head plans to kill nithya to make Raghuvaran life beautiful and joyful. But Nithya Shree escapes and comes to agni amman temple where there is a major twist where tharun and Nithya meet each other. Soon, she comes home but her mother-in-law and father-in-law are angry at her for ruining her son's life. The couple decide to get married again as Nithya threw her nuptial thread away (remember!) As they go on a car journey, Chakravathy (Raghuvaran's descendent) arranges a car accident for them. Nithya is struck into a comma but heals herself and hides with Ranjith to confront her enemies.

Cast

Main
 Lakshmipriya as Nayanthara and Nithyashree aka Nithya − Tharun's lover and wife
 Ravi Tej as Raghuvaran - Nithya's admirer (100 years ago) (present story arc)
 Arun Padmanabhan as Tarun − Nithyashree's husband
 Keerthi Vijay as Deepika − Tarun's paternal cousin
 Jeeva as Ranjith (doctor)
 Harishankar as Damodaran Nambudri

Recurring 
 KS Suchitra → Smrithi → Priyanka as Sulochana − Tarun's mother
 Rajesh → Sai Gopi as Aarumugam − Tarun's father
 Sumi Sreekumar as Mridhula − Tarun's paternal aunt; Deepika's mother
 Raveena Daha as Baakiyalakshmi − Nithyashree's younger sister
 V. Dasarathy as Kodi − Nithyashree's father
 Neelakandan as Prathap − Tarun's elder brother
 Egavalli as Shubha − Tarun's elder sister-in-law; Prathap's wife
 Varun Udhay as Aravind − Nithya's cousin

Crossover Episodes 
Maangalya Sandhosham had crossover episodes with Amman  from 15 March 2021 to 27 March 2021.
For the second time Maangalya Sandhosham had crossover episodes with Amman from 10 May 2021 to 10 September 2021. However, the crossover episodes moved without Arun Padmanabhan (Tharun) and Lakshmipriya (Nithya).

International broadcast
The series was released on 23 March 2020 on Colors Tamil and Colors Tamil HD. The show was also broadcast internationally on the network's international channels.
 It airs in Sri Lanka, Singapore, the United States, Europe, Malaysia, Mauritius, the Middle East, Africa, East Asia, South Africa, Australasia and North America on Colors Tamil and Colors Tamil HD.
 Episodes can be viewed with the app Voot.
 It is also available via Internet TV services Lebara Play and YuppTV.

References 

Colors Tamil original programming
Tamil-language fantasy television series
2020s Tamil-language television series
2020 Tamil-language television series debuts
Tamil-language television shows